The Shout is a 1978 British horror film directed by Jerzy Skolimowski. It was based on a short story by Robert Graves and adapted for the screen by Skolimowski and Michael Austin. The film was the first to be produced by Jeremy Thomas under his Recorded Picture Company banner.

Premise 
Crossley (Alan Bates), a mysterious travelling man invades the lives of a young couple, Rachel and Anthony Fielding (Susannah York and John Hurt). Anthony is a composer, who experiments with sound effects and various electronic sources in his secluded Devon studio. The couple provides hospitality to Crossley but his intentions are gradually revealed as more sinister. He claims he has learned from an Aboriginal shaman how to produce a "terror shout" that can kill anyone who hears it unprotected.

Cast
 Alan Bates as Crossley
 Susannah York as Rachel Fielding
 John Hurt as Anthony Fielding
 Robert Stephens as Chief Medical Officer
 Tim Curry as Robert Graves
 Julian Hough as Vicar
 Carol Drinkwater as Wife
 Susan Wooldridge as Harriet
 Jim Broadbent as Fielder in cowpat

Production 
Interiors were shot at Pinewood Studios, the film's sets were designed by the art director Simon Holland. The North Devon coastline, specifically Saunton Sands and Braunton Burrows, was used for the bulk of the location shooting. The church of St Peter in Westleigh was used for the church scenes. The producer, Jeremy Thomas, later remembered his experience making the film,

The soundtrack is by Michael Rutherford and Tony Banks of the rock band Genesis. The central theme "From the Undertow" features on Banks's album A Curious Feeling.

Accolades
The film was nominated for the Palme d'Or at the 1978 Cannes Film Festival and received the Grand Prize of the Jury, in a tie with Bye Bye Monkey.

In popular culture
In The Guard (2011), Sergeant Boyle (Brendan Gleeson) is seen watching The Shout on television.

References

External links
 
 

1978 films
1978 horror films
British horror films
Films based on short fiction
Films about magic and magicians
Films set in Devon
Films directed by Jerzy Skolimowski
Films produced by Jeremy Thomas
Films with screenplays by Jerzy Skolimowski
Cannes Grand Prix winners
1970s English-language films
1970s British films